Farmington Quaker Crossroads Historic District is a national historic district located at Farmington in Ontario County, New York. The district encompasses 11 contributing components and three non-contributing components. The centerpiece of the district is the Farmington Friends Meetinghouse, an Orthodox Quaker meetinghouse built in 1876, with a commemorative tablet marking the sites of meetinghouses built in 1796 and 1804, but later demolished.  Also in the district is an 1816 Quaker Meetinghouse constructed by the Hicksite Quakers and currently under restoration.

It was listed on the National Register of Historic Places in 2007.

References

External links
Farmington's Quaker Meeting House website
Farmington Meetinghouse Restoration website

Churches on the National Register of Historic Places in New York (state)
Historic districts in Ontario County, New York
Historic districts on the National Register of Historic Places in New York (state)
National Register of Historic Places in Ontario County, New York
1796 establishments in New York (state)